Birger Rosengren (29 October 1917 – 15 October 1977) was a Swedish international footballer who played for IFK Norrköping as a midfielder. During his club career, he won the national Swedish league (Allsvenskan) five times.

International career
Rosengren played nine times for his home country, and as team captain he won the gold medal with the Swedish Olympic team at the 1948 Summer Olympics, at which he played in 4 games including the final.

Honours
IFK Norrköping
 Allsvenskan: 1942–43, 1944–45, 1945–46, 1946–47, 1947–48
 Svenska Cupen: 1943, 1945
Sweden
 Summer Olympics: 1948

References

External links

 

1917 births
1977 deaths
Swedish footballers
Sweden international footballers
Olympic footballers of Sweden
Olympic gold medalists for Sweden
Footballers at the 1948 Summer Olympics
IFK Norrköping players
Olympic medalists in football
Association football midfielders
Medalists at the 1948 Summer Olympics
Sportspeople from Norrköping
Footballers from Östergötland County